The Europe and Africa Zone is one of the three zones of regional Davis Cup competition in 2012.

In the Europe and Africa Zone there are four different groups in which teams compete against each other to advance to the next group.

The Europe Zone third group tournament was held between 2 and 5 May 2012 in Sofia, Bulgaria.

Lithuania and Bulgaria were promoted to the second group of Davis Cup for the following year.

Teams

Format
The 13 teams will be split into four pools. The winners of pool A and pool B will be drawn to play against the winners of pool C and pool D. Two winning nations will be promoted to Europe/Africa Zone of Group II for 2013.

All matches of this group were played on 2–5 May 2012 in Sofia, Bulgaria and they were played on outdoor clay court.

Group stage

Group A

Andorra vs. San Marino

Lithuania vs. San Marino

Andorra vs. Lithuania

Group B

Albania vs. Bulgaria

Albania vs. Georgia

Bulgaria vs. Georgia

Group C

Armenia vs. Macedonia

Armenia vs. Montenegro

Macedonia vs. Montenegro

Group D

Greece vs. Malta

Iceland vs. Norway

Malta vs. Norway

Greece vs. Iceland

Greece vs. Norway

Iceland vs. Malta

Playoffs

1st to 4th play-off

Lithuania vs Greece

Bulgaria vs Macedonia

5th to 8th play-off

Andorra vs Norway

Georgia vs Armenia

9th to 10th play-off

San Marino vs Malta

Albania vs Montenegro

References

External links
Draw Results

Europe Africa Zone Group III
Davis Cup Europe/Africa Zone